The 2017 European Youth Olympic Winter Festival was held in Erzurum, Turkey from 12 to 17 February 2017.

The event had initially been planned for Sarajevo and East Sarajevo, Bosnia and Herzegovina,
whereas the 2019 EYOF had been planned for Erzurum. In November 2015, the two cities agreed to swap their events, since Sarajevo could not be ready in time, while Erzurum already had facilities in place from the 2011 Winter Universiade.

Venues

Sports

Schedule
The competition schedule for the 2017 European Youth Olympic Winter Festival is as follows:

Participating nations
34 national federations sent athletes. Kosovo made its European Youth Olympic Winter Festival at these games.

Medal table

Mascot
The mascot of 2017 European Youth Olympic Winter Festival is a snowman named Karbeyaz. The name Karbeyaz, which is combined from the Turkish words Kar (snow) and Beyaz (white), won the public vote against the other 3 proposed names.

References

External links
Official website
Results book (archived)

 
European Youth Olympic Winter Festival
European Youth Olympic Winter Festival
Youth Olympic Winter Festival
International sports competitions hosted by Turkey
2017 in Turkish sport
Sport in Erzurum
Multi-sport events in Turkey
Youth sport in Turkey
European Youth Olympic Winter Festival
European Youth Olympic Winter Festival
History of Erzurum